John Raymond Martin (18 November 1909 – 28 July 1988) was an Australian rules footballer who played in the VFL in 1930 and then from 1932 to 1940 for the Richmond Football Club.

References 

 Hogan P: The Tigers Of Old, Richmond FC, Melbourne 1996

External links
 
 

Richmond Football Club players
Richmond Football Club Premiership players
Australian rules footballers from Victoria (Australia)
Daylesford Football Club players
1909 births
1988 deaths
Two-time VFL/AFL Premiership players